Cupferron is jargon for the ammonium salt of the conjugate base derived from N-nitroso-N-phenylhydroxylamine. It once was a common reagent for the complexation of metal ions, being of interest in the area of qualitative inorganic analysis. Its formula is
NH4[C6H5N(O)NO]. The anion binds to metal cations through the two oxygen atoms, forming five-membered chelate rings.

Synthesis and complexes

Cupferron is prepared from phenylhydroxylamine and an NO+ source:
C6H5NHOH + C4H9ONO + NH3 → NH4[C6H5N(O)NO] + C4H9OH

Being a bidentate mono-anionic ligand, CU− forms complexes analogous to those produced with acetylacetonate.  Illustrative complexes include Cu(CU)2, Fe(CU)3, and Zr(CU)4.

References

Phenyl compounds
Ammonium compounds
Nitroso compounds